Simon Asta (born 25 January 2001) is a German professional footballer who plays as a right-back for Bundesliga club Greuther Fürth.

Career
On 5 October 2020, the last day of the 2020 summer transfer window, Asta joined SpVgg Greuther Fürth from FC Augsburg. He signed a two-year contract with the option of a third year.

References

External links
 
 Profile on FuPa.net

2001 births
Living people
Sportspeople from Augsburg
German footballers
Footballers from Bavaria
Association football fullbacks
Germany under-21 international footballers
Germany youth international footballers
Bundesliga players
2. Bundesliga players
Regionalliga players
FC Augsburg players
SpVgg Greuther Fürth players